Eschata radiata is a moth in the family Crambidae. It was described by Charles Swinhoe in 1906. It is found in Indonesia, where it has been recorded from the Moluccas.

References

Chiloini
Moths described in 1906